Lead user is a term developed by American economist Eric von Hippel. His definition for lead user is:
Lead users face needs that will be general in a marketplace – but face them months or years before the bulk of that marketplace encounters them, and
Lead users are positioned to benefit significantly by obtaining a solution to their needs and so may innovate.

Lead users are a very important source of innovative progress because they often pioneer - acting earlier than producers to develop important new types of products and applications. Being innovation pioneers benefits lead users because they innovate to serve their own needs. For this reason, they need not concern themselves with whether others will also want what they are developing for themselves. In contrast, producers must wait for evidence that there is a general and profitable market to be served before they can justify investing in a new type of innovation. For example, mountain bikes were developed by individuals who simply wanted to bike down mountains for fun, and so invented the sport of mountain biking for themselves. Bike producers stood by, simply watching and waiting for years until the extent of the market became clear. Finally, after the new sport had spread to hundreds of enthusiasts who participated by building their own "clunker" mountain bikes, producers finally entered the new market with the first commercial mountain bike products. 
Because lead users develop new products and services and also modify existing ones, they are related to the creative consumer phenomenon, that is, those "customers who adapt, modify, or transform a proprietary offering".

Lead user method introduction
Because lead users are often the originators of functionally novel product and service innovations, producer firms have an interest in identifying the innovations they may have developed and analyzing their commercial potential. The Lead User Method is a market research tool that has been developed to assist producers in doing this task.  It is often used by companies and / or individuals seeking to develop breakthrough products.  Lead User methodology was originally developed by Dr. Eric von Hippel of the Massachusetts Institute of Technology (MIT) and first described in the July 1986 issue of Management Science. In contrast to the traditional market research techniques that collect information from the users at the center of the target market, the Lead User method takes a different approach, collecting information about both needs and solutions from the leading edges of the target market and from analogue markets, markets facing similar problems in a more extreme form.

The methodology involves four major steps: 
Start of the Lead User process
Identification of Needs and Trends
Identification of Lead Users and interviews
Concept Design (Workshop).

The methodology is based upon the idea that breakthrough products may be developed by identifying leading trends in the to-be-developed product’s associated marketplace(s).  Once the trend or broader problem to be solved has been identified, the developers seek out “Lead Users”- people or organizations that are attempting to solve a particularly extreme or demanding version of the stated problem.

For example, a company seeking to create a breakthrough in flashlight design may seek out policemen, home inspectors, or others who require bright, efficient lights as part of their day-to-day business.  Once these “lead users” have been identified, networking is employed and the lead users are interviewed so as to gain their insight into how they solve the problem for themselves.  The lead users are also queried to determine whether they have knowledge of individuals or organizations who are considered to be “outside the market” and have even more extreme portable lighting needs than the policemen or home inspectors that go beyond flashlights; in our example, these users might be photographers, divers, or movie lighting designers.  (See the “Examples of Lead User Method” section of this article for more examples of lead user identification.)  By learning from both the lead users and the outside-the-market users, companies may identify new methods or approaches towards creating innovative products that are true breakthroughs via ideas that may not have surfaced by simply examining existing users with traditional market research techniques.

Review of existing literature

Research on lead users emerged from studies on sources of innovation.  It was first found that users (as opposed to manufacturers) are often the first to develop new products that are commercially successful.  Additionally, it was found that innovation by users tended to be concentrated among the “lead users” of those products and processes.  These “lead users” were individuals or organizations who had experienced needs for a given innovation earlier than the majority of the target market. Recent research highlights the fact that lead users exist for services also (Skiba and Herstatt 2009, Skiba 2010, Oliveira and Von Hippel 2011).

Various studies have explored the effectiveness of this theory in terms of identifying any user innovations. The effect found in these studies tends to be very large; for example, Urban and Von Hippel (1988) found that 82 percent of a given lead-user cluster had developed their own version of, or had modified a specific type of, the industrial product under study… whereas only 1 percent of the non-lead users had done this.
 
Empirical studies have also found that many of the innovations developed by users have commercial attractiveness.  For example, Urban and Von Hippel (1988) found that lead user theory can be effectively utilized in industrial software product development; Morrison, Roberts, and Von Hippel (2000) found that many IT innovations developed by libraries had broader potential value; and Luthje (2003) found that 48 percent of surgical innovations developed by surgeons in university clinics in Germany could be produced as commercial products.

Based on its widespread success, it has been suggested that the lead user methodology should be integrated into corporate new product development efforts (Urban and Von Hippel, 1988). Companies may benefit (to a large extent) as they try to learn from lead users about the needs and solutions encountered at the leading edge of the market.  Increasingly, this type of customer integration is being discussed among innovation management scholars (Enkel, Javier, and Gassmann, 2005; Luthje and Herstatt, 2004).  The idea is also spreading rapidly in the business world (Coyne, 2000; Dehne, 2003; Intrachooto, 2004); for example, lead-user concepts developed and used at 3M showed product sales potential that was an average of eight times higher than for sales of products using more traditional development concepts / processes (Lilien et al., 2002).

Two basic types of lead user search method

The central task in lead user studies is searching for lead users with valuable innovations to share.  Two different methods exist - one is best suited to searches for product innovations developed by consumer lead users.  The second is best suited for identifying innovations developed by professional lead users like medical personnel, or by developers within firms like banks that may have developed process improvements for their own use.

AI search of user-generated content posted on the web

Lead user consumers often post descriptions of their developments openly on the web.  They do this to share their development activities with peers who share the same interest.  For example, parents may openly post parenting innovations on a specialized website in order to help other parents, and also to gain from improvements contributed by others. Similarly, sporting enthusiasts may post improvements they have made to sporting equipment or techniques for use and further improvement by others.  Since these innovations are openly posted on the web, the posted content is searchable by AI methods.  Specifically a rapid search method based upon semantic network analytic and memory model techniques has been demonstrated to be effective. In essence, the method scans thousands of websites that have been made openly available to all, searching openly posted textual content for instances that both describe an improvement in a field of interest to the searcher, and that contain phrases indicating the presence of an innovation such as "I invented" or "I solved this problem." To isolate those innovations of general interest to users, and so of potential commercial value to producers, the innovation descriptions identified are then assessed to determine how frequently they have been the subject of web searches: the higher the frequency, the higher the likelihood of commercial potential. (Individuals using this method must be sure to first check governmental rules regulating web searches: these are rapidly evolving.)

"Pyramiding" search processes for identifying lead user innovations not publicly posted

Pyramiding involves a sequence of telephonic or email interviews of experts in a professional or industrial setting.  Each interviewee is initially selected on the basis of writings or reputation as someone knowledgeable in a subject of interest - for example, control of infections resulting from surgeries. Each of these interviewees is contacted and asked whether they know of someone who faces extreme problems on the topic of interest, and whether that person has innovated to their knowledge.  For example, a general surgeon, when asked this question, might point to surgeons who deal with immune-compromised patients who are more likely to get infections than average patients. The individuals identified in this way are generally further up the "pyramid of expertise" than the initial interviewees.  They are than contacted and interviewed in turn. From 5 to 20 of these pyramiding interviews, when carefully conducted, are generally sufficient to connect searchers with lead user innovators of the type they are seeking.

Examples of lead user studies

The lead user method can be utilized in any industry and at any level of product complexity. The following are examples where the Lead User method was utilized to create a new product which satisfied a specific need:

3M

The lead user method was utilized in 3M’s Medical-Surgical Division to develop a breakthrough surgical drape product. 3M assembled a team of lead users which included a veterinarian surgeon, a makeup artist, doctors from developing countries and military medics.

Hilti AG

Hilti utilized the lead user method to develop a simplified pipe hanger. Hilti put together a lead user group consisting of lead layout engineers, researchers from construction departments of institutes, an engineer from a professional organization in Bonn, and two engineers from municipal building departments.

Nortel

Nortel utilized the lead user method to develop a new class of web applications for voice, video and data. Nortel put together a group of lead users including law enforcement professionals, paramedics, military personnel, animal trackers and professional storm trackers.

Sense Worldwide

Sense Worldwide has been featured in Wired magazine  and Fast Company  for using Lead Users such as dominatrices, Nigerian hackers, medical tourists and OCD sufferers in their innovation work.

Local Motors

Local Motors is the first car company to utilize the lead user method to co-create vehicles online with its virtual community of designers, fabricators, engineers and enthusiasts. The world’s first vehicle produced using co-creative method is the Local Motors Rally Fighter.

See also

 Alpha consumer
 Beta test
 Coolhunting
 Crossing the Chasm
 Diffusion (business)
 Diffusion of innovations
 Dominance (economics)
 Early adopter
 Eating your own dog food
 Eric von Hippel
 Experimental techniques
 Focus group
 Hipsters
 Innovation
 Learning-by-doing (economics)
 Marketing
 Observational techniques
 Participatory design
 Product lifecycle management
 Qualitative marketing research
 Quantitative marketing research
 Technology adoption lifecycle
 Toolkits for user innovation
 User innovation
 Empathic design
 Whole Product

References

External links
Websites
Eric Von Hippel's books on user innovation, available under the creative commons license.
OpenInnovators.de The official Open Innovation Community for Germany, Switzerland & Austria

Papers

 

Innovation